Asperula tetraphylla is a species of flowering plant in the family Rubiaceae. It was first described in 2009 and is endemic to South Australia.

References 

tetraphylla
Flora of Australia